Bertille Noël-Bruneau (born February 26, 1996) is a French actress, who became famous through her role in the French film The Fox and the Child.

Filmography 
 2005: The Girl from the Chartreuse (La Petite Chartreuse): Eva Blanchot
 2007: The Fox and the Child (Le Renard et l'enfant): the child

Documentary 
 2005: Au coeur de 'La petite Chartreuse''': herself

 Nominations 
Nomination for the Young Artist Award 2008 for the category “Best Performance in an International Feature Film - Leading Young Performer” for The Fox and The Child'' (2007)

External links 

 Photos of a press conference for The Girl from the Chartreuse
  Information about Bertille Noël-Bruneau on Allociné

References 

French film actresses
French child actresses
1996 births
Living people
21st-century French actresses